This list of 10 metre air pistol records documents the best performances in 10 metre air pistol recognized as records by various official instances since 1 January 1989, when targets were changed and all records reset, and also the progression of the World and Olympic records.

Men's qualification round 
The men's qualification round consists of 60 shots, and the maximum possible score is 600.

Current World, Olympic, continental, regional and national records

Men's final 
The final consists of an additional 10 shots, for a total maximum of 109.0 points. Records are ratified for the aggregate (qualification + final) score of maximum 709.0 points.

Current World, Olympic, continental, regional and national records

Women's qualification round 
As the men's qualification round did until 1980, the women's match still consists of 40 shots, for a maximum possible score of 400 points.

Current World, Olympic, continental, regional and national records

Women's final 
The final consists of an additional 10 shots, for a total maximum of 109.0 points. Records are ratified for the aggregate (qualification + final) score of maximum 509.0 points.

Legend 
ECH = European Championships
OG = Olympic Games
WC = ISSF World Cup
WCF = ISSF World Cup Final
WCH = ISSF World Shooting Championships

See also
 List of Olympic medalists in shooting
 ISSF Olympic skeet
 ISSF Olympic trap

References

External links
 

Sports records and statistics
Sport shooting-related lists